Izabelin  is a village in Warsaw West County, Masovian Voivodeship, in east-central Poland. It is the seat of the gmina (administrative district) called Gmina Izabelin.

The village has a population of 12,500.

References

External links
 Jewish Community in Izabelin on Virtual Shtetl

Izabelin